Thomas Burges (July 1830 – 7 August 1893) was an Australian pastoralist and politician who was a member of the Legislative Council of Western Australia on three occasions – from 1874 to 1878, from 1885 to 1887, and from 1890 until his death.

Burges was born in York, Western Australia, to Judith (née Kearnan) and Samuel Evans Burges. His younger half-brother, Richard Goldsmith Burges, was also a member of parliament, as were two of his uncles, William and Lockier Burges. In 1859, Burges acquired Bowes Station, a pastoral lease in the Mid-West that had been established by his uncles. In 1870, he developed Yuin Station, subsequently helping to open a stock route north to the Gascoyne. Burges served on the Northampton Road Board from 1871 to 1877, including as chairman for a period.

In 1874, Burges was elected to the Legislative Council, representing the newly created Northern District. He served until January 1878, when he resigned in order to take a trip to Europe. Burges returned to parliament in July 1885, when he was appointed to the Legislative Council by the governor, Sir Frederick Broome. He resigned in June 1887, but was re-appointed in December 1890, following the council's reconstitution as an upper house (rather than a unicameral chamber). Burges died suddenly in August 1893 (aged 63), from influenza. He had married Augusta Wittenoom (a daughter of John Burdett Wittenoom) in 1860, but they had no children.

References

1830 births
1893 deaths
Australian pastoralists
Australian people of Irish descent
Deaths from influenza
Mayors of places in Western Australia
Members of the Western Australian Legislative Council
People from York, Western Australia
19th-century Australian politicians
19th-century Australian businesspeople
Western Australian local councillors